Jinshi Township is a township under the administration of Suichuan County, in Jiangxi, China. , it has one residential community and 13 villages under its administration.

References 

Township-level divisions of Jiangxi
Suichuan County